Nabi Bakhsh Khan Baloch (Balochi: نبی بخش خان  بلۏچ) (16 December 1917 – 6 April 2011) was a research scholar and writer. He was termed as a 'moving library' on the province of Sindh, Pakistan.

He contributed to many subjects and disciplines of knowledge which include history, education, folklore, archeology, anthropology, musicology, Islamic culture and civilization. His published works in English, Arabic, Persian, Urdu and Sindhi. He contributed articles on 'Sindh' and 'Baluchistan' which appeared in the Fifteenth Edition of Encyclopædia Britannica, 1972.

He did pioneering work on the classic poets of Sindh which culminated in the Ten Volume Critical Text of Shah Jo Risalo, the poetic compendium of Shah Abdul Latif Bhittai, the great Sufi poet of Sindh. He edited forty-two volumes on Sindhi Folklore, with scholarly prefaces in English, 'Folklore and Literature Project' Sindhi Adabi Board.

In addition, he compiled and published a Sindhi dictionary, Jami'a Sindhi Lughaat' in five volumes which was later revised in three volumes. He also compiled Sindhi-to-Urdu, Urdu-to-Sindhi dictionaries co-authored with Ghulam Mustafa Khan. His works also include the compilation and editing of classical Sindhi poets including Shah Inayat Rizvi, Qadi Qadan, Khalifo Nabibakhsh, and Hamal Faqir. In the field of history, the following works edited by Baloch hold a special importance: Tareekh Ma'soomee, Chachnama, Tuhfatul Kiram by Mir Ali Sher Qania, Lubb-i-Tareekh Sindh by Khudad Khan, Tareekh-i-Tahiree by Mir Tahir Muhammad Nisyani, Beglar Nama  by Idrakee Beglaree.

Early life 
Nabi Bakhsh Baloch, son of Ali Mohammad Khan Laghari Baloch, was born in the village of Jaffer Khan Laghari, District Sanghar of Sindh, Pakistan on 16 December 1917. He belongs to the Leghari tribe of  Baloch people.  He obtained his early education at Village Palio Khan Laghari from a local teacher. He then went on to acquire Secondary education from the famed Naushero Feroz Madressah . He completed Matriculation in 1936 and affiliated himself with Bahaudin Degree College, Junagarh, in 1941. Baloch then went on to Aligarh Muslim University. According to Baloch this was where he cultivated the acquaintance of Sub-Continent's  intellectual elite whose inspiring influence equipped him to become the 'man of letters'.

Baloch returned to Sindh and while teaching at Sindh Muslim College, Karachi (1945–46) as a professor of Arabic, he applied for scholarship to the U.S. for higher education. He left for the U.S. in 1946 and joined the 'Teachers College', Columbia University, New York, for his master's degree in education and later acquired a Ph.D. in the same discipline in the year 1949.

After the completion of his thesis on Teacher's Education, he joined an internship program with United Nations. owing to his highly impressive work at U.N. he was offered a permanent post there, which he chose to decline and returned to Pakistan.

Career 
In 1950, Baloch joined the Ministry of Information and Broadcasting (Pakistan) (called Ministry of Information back then), as officer on special duty. Baloch set a trend in government publications as well as broadcasting on radio. He initiated the monthly magazine Naeen Zindagi. Numerous other publications about Pakistan and its five provinces were started by Dr. N.A. Baloch to educate the public and counter the propaganda from across the border. In addition, he promoted the folk music and folk culture of the five provinces through radio.

In 1951, he was appointed as Public Relations Officer for Pakistan Mission in Damascus. However, he opted to participate in the making of the Sindh University, Hyderabad, Sindh and once again returned to homeland for a higher cause. He was the first professor appointed by the university where he established the first ever Department of Education in Pakistan. In 1973, Baloch was conferred with National Merit Award and was elevated to the position of Vice Chancellor of the University of Sindh(1973-1976). During his tenure at the university he was responsible for initiating several  publications and editing monographs such as: Journal of Education, Journal of Research: Arts and Social Sciences, Historical Perspective on Education, Methods of Teaching Hasil-a-lNijh of Jafar al- Bubakani, and Report on Education in Sindh with an extensive introduction by Baloch (drawn by B.H. Ellis, first printed for the Government at the Bombay Education Society Press in 1856).

Baloch also played a key role in the establishment of various institutes associated with the University of Sindh. Department of Sindhi began work in 1953. A Sindhi Academy initiated earlier by Baloch developed into the concept of the Institute of Sindhology. Baloch worked out the draft of the scheme to establish the institution at Sindh University, which was approved by the Secretary of Education. Baloch served as the Director and at his insistence, the name was changed from Academy to Institute. Baloch had the Institute shifted form Old Campus to the New Campus. the institute, now, has a large library, a museum, heritage gallery and an auditorium. It has been carrying out the work of collecting and preserving books and other materials on Sindh and publishing them. Baloch initiated the publication of the monthly journal of the Institute under the name Ilmee Aa'eeno (Mirror of Knowledge)

Parallel to the continuing scholarly endeavours mentioned above, Baloch during his tenure at the Sindh University remained a guiding force for several institutes in Sindh. He worked as Honorary Secretary Bhitshah Cultural Centre where he organized literary conferences during the annual functions. He promoted the rural cultural milieu, spreading the message of Shah Abdul Latif Bhitai. In this regard he published studies on Shah Jo Risalo. The first biographical work on Shah Abdul Latif written in Persian by Mir Abdul Hussain Khan Sangi,  Lutaif-i-Lateefee, was edited and introduced by Baloch and published by Bhitshah Cultural Centre in 1967. The manuscripts of Shah Jo Risalo were procured from London and published in 1969.

Mehran Arts Council was established under the chairmanship of the commissioner of Hyderabad, Baloch as honorary secretary, worked out the scheme, persuaded authorities to give grants, bought a plot for the council in Latifabad and had a building constructed. Baloch wrote 'Musical Instruments of the Lower Valley of Sindh' (1966), and two articles as appendices: ‘Shah Abdul Latif as the Founder of a New Musical Tradition’ by Baloch and the ‘Traditional Music of Sindh’ by Ilyas Ishqie. This work was translated into Bengali by Folk Music Research Group, Dacca, East Pakistan in 1970. Baloch also edited Aziz Baloch's work, ‘Spanish Cante Jundo and its Origin in Sindhi Music’, published by Mehran Arts council in 1968. Among other articles and monographs, Mehran Arts Council also published Sabhai Rangga (All Hues) on all aspects of folkloric poetry in 1969 edited and introduced by Baloch.

Baloch was also instrumental in influencing decisions by the Archaeological Department and extended his cooperation in initiating excavations at Bhanbhore, Mansura, Umarkot, and Talpur Museum at Hyderabad Fort. He persuaded the Department of Archaeology to establish Zonal office of Archaeology at Hyderabad. The wall of the fort of Hyderabad near the main gate, Mosque of Mian Yarr Mohammad, Graveyards at Landhi and Mian Wahyoon, Tomb of Mir Shahdad Khan and number of other historical places were preserved at his behest.

The landmark achievement in this regard was the establishment of a number of museums. Land was procured and buildings were constructed alongside the Raani Bagh on National Highway for the Sindh Provincial Museum and Sindh Provincial Library for which Baloch had been working since 1951. Baloch served as honorary director and donated his personal collection of artifacts, coins and other materials.

On an international level, Baloch collaborated with Dr. Knez in setting up the ‘Sindhi House of Pakistan’ at the Smithsonian Institution, Washington D.C., and made arrangements for the relevant material to be exported.

It was also during Baloch's term as the vice chancellor of Sindh University (1973 - 1976) that an International Conference ‘Sindh Through the Centuries’ was held from 2 to 7 March 1975 at Karachi, jointly hosted by Karachi and Sindh Universities. Baloch as one of the chief hosts took the delegates to visit the historical and archeological sites most of which had been discussed in the papers presented at the conference. Illustrious scholars from world over who participated in the conference included: H.T. Lambrick, J.E. van Lohuizen, J.A. Boyle, S.Digby, C.F. Buckingham, Annemarie Schimmel and E.I. Knez.

From January 1976 to June 1989, Baloch's services were acquired by the Federal Government of Pakistan in Islamabad, on specific orders by the then Prime Minister Zulfiqar Ali Bhutto. Baloch was given the designation of Secretary for Culture, Archaeology, Sports and Tourism, a post he served at for one year. Important projects supervised and guided by Baloch include the Centenary Celebrations of Quaid e Azam Mohammad Ali Jinnah (1976) and Allama Muhammad Iqbal (1977). He also served as Member Federal Pay Commission and Member Federal Review Board.

From 1 July 1979 and up to October 1979, Baloch was appointed chairman of the National Commission on Historical and Cultural Research. The institute was able to initiate several projects of significance under his chairmanship. The following research works were launched:

Publication of "Pakistan Journal of History and Culture"
Chachanama, critical edition with Persian text, English translation and extensive Introduction and notes
Advent of Islam in Indonesia
Maulana Ubaidullah Sindhi’s Diary During His Days of Residence in Kabul, Afghanistan

The following other projects were completed:
Pakistan: A comprehensive Bibliography of Books and Government Publications with Annotations 1947-80, Islamabad, 1981, pp. 515 edited by Baloch.
Two volumes of Documentations on Separation of Sindh from Bombay edited by Dr. Hamida Khuhro of which the first volume was published.
History of the Taxila Region

A project in six volumes studying architectural monuments of
Pakistan
Thatta and Makli
Uch
Multan
Lahore 
and Wooden Architecture in Northern areas.

Except Pakistan and the work on Lahore, the rest of the studies were completed and published during Baloch’s tenure. The work on Thatta and Makli was assigned to Dr. Ahmad Hassan Dani. Baloch would accompany Dr. Dani to Thatta and provide all possible help in this regard. He wrote a detailed introduction on the city of Thatta which was appended to the work.

Baloch planned a project of 25 volumes of history of the Muslim Rule in the Subcontinent to be published by the institute. The first seven volumes of the project were to include original works on
Advent of Muslims in Sindh; Fatehnama (Persian Text, English Text, Arabic Text)
Arab Rule in Sindh (712-1050 AD),
Ghaznavi Period,
Ghaurid Sultans, and Delhi’s Sultans of Slave Dynasty,
Khalji Period,
Tughlaq Period,
Afghan Kings: Lodhi & Suri Periods.

The next five volumes (8th to 12th) were designed to cover the Mughal Empire: (8) Babur & Humayun. (9) Akbar, (10) Jahangir & Shahjahan, (11) Aurangzeb, and (12) Decline of Moghuls. The next seven volumes (13th to 19th) were expected to cover ‘Local Rulers’: (13) Sultans of Bengal, Jaunpur, Awadh; (14) Deccan and 18 Mysore; (15) Gujrat & Malvah; (16) Sindh; (17) Punjab & Sarhad; (18) Baluchistan; and (19) Kashmir. The 20th volume was to cover the British Period: Freedom Movements. The remaining five volumes (21st to 25th) were planned to cover various aspects of the ‘Islamic Heritage’: (21) Governmental Institutions (Establishment), (22) Education, Social Sciences, Physical Sciences, Mathematics, Navigation, (23) Communications, City Development, Agriculture, Industry & Technology, Trade & Commerce, (24) Art of Construction (Architect and Archeology) and related Arts & Skills, and (25) literature.

In November 1980, Baloch was called upon to take charge as the first Vice Chancellor of the International Islamic University, Islamabad. The university became functional in shortest possible time under Baloch's punctilious and sanguine management. However, he resigned in August, 1982 and continued his work at the National Institute of Historical Research until October, 1982. From 1983 to 1989, Baloch served as adviser to ‘National Hijra Council.’ Here, Baloch began work on the ‘One Hundred Great Books of Islamic Civilization’_ a project that was of high standing in its originality and literary value. In all, eleven works were published out of which five were produced under Baloch’s personal supervision. The work on remaining six was finalized, but published after he left the organization (1989) and returned to his hometown, Hyderabad.

Books that were edited with introductions by Baloch under the Great Books Project are as follows:
Al Khawarazmi’s Algebra, original Arabic text with Rosen’s translation, introduction by Prof. Ayidin Sayili, and explanatory notes by Mullek Dous was published in 1989.
Banu Musa, Kitab al-Hiyal (The Book of Ingenious Mechanical Devices), translated, annotated, and introduced by Dr. Donald Hill.
Al-Jazari’s Kitabul Hiyal, (Integration between Theory and Practice in the Application of Mechanics), translated into English by Ahmad Y. al-Hassan and introduced by Donald Hill, 1989. This work speaks of 19 Sindhian Waterwheel that has erroneously been called Persian Wheel.
Al-Biruni’s Kitab al-Jamahir fee Ma’ arifat al-Jawahir, translated by Hakim Mohammad Said, and edited by Dr. N.A Baloch, 1988. The work discusses al-Beruni’s experiment which for the first time introduced the concept of ‘Specific Gravity’.
 Hamidullah Khan, The Prophet Establishing A State, 1989.

Baloch, in 1989, formally began the compiling, rearranging and editing of the authentic text of the Poetic Compendium of Shah Abdul Latif Bhitai, Shah Jo Risalo. This was a gigantic project involving not only extensive research and deep rooted understanding of the great poet’s philosophy but also an optimum expertise in Sindhi Language itself. In this regard he also produced a companion dictionary Roshni for the understanding of the classical text.

In 1991, Sindhi Language Authority was established by the Government of Sindh, and Baloch was invited to join as its chairman. Baloch remained with this institute for a period of 27 months during which numerous works were published on a multitude of topics pertaining the teaching and promotion of Sindhi Language. During his tenure at Sindhi Language Authority he was also given the additional charge of Minister for Education with the caretaker government for a period of three months.

Baloch remained Professor Emeritus Allama I.I Kazi Chair, University of Sindh, established in 1990 until his demise.

UN and UNESCO forums and international conferences 

  Participation  in  the  United Nations Internship  Program, Summer 1948
  U.N. Accredited Speaker (1948-49 toured Canada Sept. 1948)
  Member  Pakistan  Delegation  to  the  UNESCO  Regional  Seminar on Primary Education in South Asia, Karachi, 1956
  Member  Pakistan  Delegation  to  Indo-Pak  Cultural  Conference,  New Delhi, 1962.
  Pakistan  Delegate  to  the  UNESCO  Meeting  of  Experts  in  Teacher Training from Asian Countries, Manila, 1963
  Member Participant, UNESCO Expert Committee on Teacher Education, Paris, December 1967
  Delivered  a  series  of  lectures  at  the  Higher  Islamic  Educational Institutes in Indonesia (March 1977) at the invitation of the Government of Indonesia
 Member  Pakistan  Delegation  to  the  20th UNESCO General  Conference, November 1978 and April 1979
  Member  International  Editorial  Committee  on  ‘History  of  Central  Asian Civilization’  (nominated  by  the  Director  General  UNESCO,  in  personal capacity as Scholar / Historian, 1980 - till death)

Awards and recognition
 Tamgha-e-Imtiaz (1962)
 Sitara-i-Quaid-i-Azam (1971)
 Pride of Performance by the President of Pakistan in 1979
 Conferment of I’zaz-i-Kamal Award by the President of Pakistan (1991)
 Sitara-i-Imtiaz (Star of Excellence) Award by the President of Pakistan in 2002
 Conferment of D. Litt, by the University of Karachi (1990)
Shah Latif and Mysticism Award by the Pakistan Academy of Letters in 1999
 Kamal-e-Fun Award (Lifetime Achievement Award) by Pakistan Academy of Letters in 2005
 Conferment of Degree of Doctorate of Educational Management, (Honours Causa) Institute of Business Administration, University of Karachi (2009)
 Hilal-i-Imtiaz  (Crescent of Excellence) Award by  the President of Pakistan (2011)
 Appointed  Life  Patron  of  Dr. N.A. Baloch,  Institute  for  Heritage Research,  Department  of  Antiquities,  Government of Sindh,  2009, founded  after  his  name  in  recognition  of  his  outstanding  academic services to Pakistan and Sindh

Publications 

 Sindhi Jami'a Lughaat (Sindhi language dictionary) (First edition in 5 volumes 1960–1988 published by Sindhi Adabi Board; 2nd revised edition in 3 volumes, published by Sindhi Language Authority 2004–2006 (third volume in Press))
 Roshni, Sindhi to Sindhi one volume dictionary, 1998, published by Sindhi Language Authority
 Sindhi Lok kahaniyoon (7 volumes)
 Madahoon Ain Munaajaatoon
 Munaqibaa
 Moajiza
 Molood
 Teeh Akhriyoon
 Hafta Deinh Ratyoon Ain Maheena
 Jang Naama
 Waqiaati Bait
 Munazira
 Sindhi Senghar (Shairy)
 Paroliyoon, Dunoon, Muamaoon Ain Bol
 Gujhartoon
 Door
 Geech
 Lok Geet
 Bait
 Narr Ja Bait
 Kafiyoon
 Mashahoor Sindhi Qisa
 Rasmoon Riwaj Ain Sanwan Saath
 Sindhi Hunr Shairy
 Kulyat-e-Hamal
 Mubeen Shah Jo Kalam
 Miyeen Shah Inaat [Inaayat] Jo Risalo
 Khalifay Nabi Bakhsh Laghari Jo Risalo
 Shah Lutfullah Qadri Jo Kalam
 Nawab Wali Muhammad LAghari Jo Kalam
 Kulyat-e-Sangi
 Beylaain Jaa Bola
 Laakho Phulani
 Kazi Qazan Jo Kalam
 Ragnamo
 Soomran Jo Daur
 Sindhi Mosiqee Je Mukhtasir Tarikh
 Sindhi Boli Ain Adab Jee Tarikh
 Sindhi Sooratkahti Ain Khatati
 Gadah
 Shah Abdul LAtif jo Risalo Shah Abdul Latif Bhittai (10 volumes), 1989 to 1999, published by various publishers
 Sindh Main Urdu Shairy (Urdu)
 Molana Azad Subhani (Urdu)
 Deewan-e-Matam (Urdu)
 Deewan-e-Shuq-e-Afza or Deewan-e-Shair
 Talaba Aur Taleem (Urdu)
 Advent of Islam in Indonesia, 1980
 Muslim Luminaries: Leaders of Religious, Intellectual and Political Revival in South Asia, 1988
 Kabul Ki Diary (Memoirs of Mawlana Obaidullah Sindhi during his days of residence in Kabul, compiled by Mawlana Abdullah Laghari, edited by N. A. Baloch
 Sindh: Studies Historical (English)
 Sindh: Studies Cultural (English)
 Traditional Arts & Crafts of Hyderabad Region (Sindh, 1966, Mehran Arts Council)
 Musical Instruments of the Lower Indus Valley of Sindh, 1966, Mehran Arts Council Hyderabad
 Gosha-e-Baloch, published by Urdu Department, University of Sindh
 Chachnama edited and translated into English (Persian, English)
 Baqiyaat az Kalhora (Persian)
 Beglar Naama by Idraki Beglari (Persian)
 Takmilatul- Takmilah, Addendum to Qania's Maqalatush-Shu'raa and Takmilla of Mohammad Ibrahim Khalil, published by Arts Faculty, Allama I.I. Kazi Campus, Sindh University, 2007 (Persian text, Sindhi preface)

Death and legacy
Nabi Bakhsh Khan Baloch died on 6 April 2011 at Hyderabad, Sindh, Pakistan. Among his survivors are five sons and three daughters. Among the personalities attending his funeral were Pir Mazharul Haq, Sassui Palijo, Dr Ghulam Ali Allana and Imdad Hussaini.
Tributes were paid to him at an event organized by the Pakistan Academy of Letters. Mir Mukhtar Talpur of Sindh Adabi Sanghat said that Baloch worked hard all his life to document everything about Sindh and recalled his lifelong contributions in preserving the culture and folklore of Sindh. He added that Baloch visited every nook and corner of Sindh to preserve its history and culture.

Fakhar Zaman, Chairman, Pakistan Academy of Letters in 2011, called the death of Nabi Baloch a great loss for Pakistani literature.

In 2017, a tribute was paid to him on his 100th birthday by Pakistan Academy of Letters Chairperson Muhammad Qasim Bughio.

See also
 Ali Muhammad Rashidi
 Allama I. I. Kazi
 Elsa Kazi
 Hassam-ud-Din Rashidi
 Mirza Qalich Baig
 Muhammad Ibrahim Joyo
 Sindhi Adabi Board
 Sindhi literature
 Umar Bin Muhammad Daudpota

References

External links

Baloch people
Pakistani Sindhologists
1917 births
2011 deaths
People from Sanghar District
Sindhi-language writers
Academic staff of the University of Sindh
Vice-Chancellors of the University of Sindh
Aligarh Muslim University alumni
Pakistani lexicographers
Pakistani folklorists
20th-century Pakistani historians
Pakistani anthropologists
Recipients of the Pride of Performance
Recipients of Tamgha-e-Imtiaz
Recipients of Sitara-i-Imtiaz
Recipients of Hilal-i-Imtiaz
Recipients of Latif Award
Scholars from Sindh